Lendlease is a globally integrated real estate company that creates and invests in communities, workplaces, retail, and infrastructure projects, headquartered in Barangaroo, New South Wales, Australia.

History

Founding 
The company was established as Lend Lease by Dick Dusseldorp in 1958 to provide finance for building contracts being undertaken by Civil & Civic. In 1961 the company acquired Civil & Civic from Bredero's Bouwbedrijf.

Lendlease first listed on the ASX in 1962. Operations expanded to the United States in 1971 and to Singapore in 1973.

In 1983 Lendlease created 'The Lendlease Foundation', their charitable arm to improve communication with and help in communities, as well as caring for both community and employee well-being.

In 1982, Lendlease acquired 50% of MLC Life Limited and in 1985 acquired the balance of the company. MLC's multi-manager, multi-style investment philosophy was introduced in 1986. It was later sold to National Australia Bank in the year 2000  for $4.56 billion, one of the biggest mergers in Australian corporate history.

Expansion and Major Acquisition 
In 1999 the company formed Actus Lend Lease with the acquisition of Actus Corporation's MILCON and technical service construction management business, and augmented this business with professionals from Lend Lease Design and Lend Lease Development. At this time the company also acquired Bovis Construction from P&O. Then in 2000 it bought Amresco's commercial mortgage business. In 2001, Lendlease acquired Delfin Property Group (now Lend Lease Communities) for $172 million. It went on to buy Crosby Homes (now Lend Lease Residential Development) for circa £240 million in 2005.

Barangaroo, Valemus Acquisition, One Lendlease Era 
In 2009, Steve McCann was appointed CEO. In the same year Lendlease Corporation acquired Babcock and Brown Communities, rebranding the business as Lend Lease Primelife. At the time, this acquisition made Lendlease Australia's largest provider of retirement villages.

In December 2009, Lendlease was selected by the New South Wales Government to develop Barangaroo.

In 2010, Lendlease announced their first foray into the consumer market with Lendlease Solar. The subsidiary was wound up in early 2011, with no explanation as to why the division had closed.

On 17 February 2011 Lendlease announced wider ranging changes to its group of brands. This announcement meant the retirement of the Bovis, Delfin, Vivas, Catalyst and Primelife brands which were superseded by the unified Lendlease brand.

In late February 2011, Lendlease acquired DASCO in order to position itself to take advantage of the impending Obama administration Health sector boom. The company was immediately rebranded as Lend Lease DASCO, and started operating independently of the Lendlease Americas business.

In March 2011, Lendlease completed the acquisition of Valemus (previously known as Bilfinger Berger Australia) from Bilfinger.

In March 2013 the business divested its aged care homes (from the acquisition of Babcock and Brown Communities) to Allity, a business owned by Australian Aged Care Partners.

In 2015, the company rebranded to use "Lendlease" as a single word.

In December 2016 Lendlease formed a joint venture agreement with Energy Made Clean. Energy Made Clean is a wholly owned subsidiary of renewable energy technology developer, Carnegie Clean Energy (ASX: CCE). With EMC and Carnegie's joint offerings, it is the only company in the world to offer a combination of wave, solar, wind, storage and desalination via microgrids. Microgrids are a budding industry and this partnership aims to provide end-to-end technologies that deliver energy independence and a reliable alternative to traditional forms of energy in regional, remote and fringe-of-grid locations in Australia, United States and around the world. This asset was later sold in 2020.

In February 2021 Lendlease announced that Tony Lombardo, previously CEO of Lendlease Asia, would takover from Steve McCann as Group CEO. This took place in June 2021.

The global COVID-19 pandemic led to enforced site closures during the early 2020s, impairing revenues. In February 2022, Lendlease reported a first half loss of $264 million, which it attributed to one-off restructuring costs, COVID-19 issues and asset sales. The company cut about 360 jobs and garnered savings of $160 million. An improved second half to the financial year saw the company post a bottom-line loss of $99 million for the full year, after $333 million in writedowns on existing operations, a 61% drop in development EBITDA to $18 million and a 24% slump in construction earnings to $131 million.

Regions
Lendlease operates in Investment management, construction, urban redevelopment, communities, retirement living, health science, data centre and digital scopes across its four regional subdivisions:

Australia 
Urban regeneration projects in Sydney at Barangaroo South, in Melbourne at Docklands, Victoria, in Brisbane at the RNA Showgrounds, and around Adelaide's Adelaide Oval are some of Lendlease's most significant and visible recent projects in Australia.

Lendlease is one of Australia's largest developer of Master Planned Communities. One of Lendlease's more controversial Communities projects is their development for housing and industry of the former Australian Defence Industries land at St Marys (Ropes Crossing & Jordan Springs) in Western Sydney. Some of the group's major Communities projects include Springfield Lakes, Queensland,  Their ADI property is the largest intact area of the biodiverse and endangered plant community, the "Cumberland Plain Woodland".

Asia 
Lendlease Asia has been working on two large urban development projects, The TRX Lifestyle Quarter in Kuala Lumpur, Malaysia, and Paya Lebar Quarter in Singapore.

Americas
Lendlease is the largest developer of public-private defence housing in the United States. Lendlease Project Management & Construction (previously Bovis Lend Lease) provided construction management services for the National September 11 Memorial & Museum in New York, in addition to a number of other major public buildings throughout the U.S. A recent Public Private Partnership involved InterContinental Hotels Group and Lendlease, where they joined forces in the Privatization of Army Lodging to deliver quality hotels to United States Army Soldiers, their Families, and official guests of the United States Army. This partnership created IHG Army Hotels, a division of InterContinental Hotels Group.

Other urban regeneration projects include Southbank, an area of Chicago, IL.

In 2012 Lendlease began construction on its first luxury home in an attempt to get into the high-end Southern California mansion market.

Soaring Heights, at Davis-Monthan AFB, Tucson, Arizona, United States, is one of Lendlease's Public Partnerships business in the US.  The 6 MW solar development is the largest solar powered community in the continental US, producing more than 10 million kilowatt hours of electricity, providing an estimated 75 percent of the community's energy needs.

In the Americas, Lendlease is based on Park Avenue in New York City, United States.

Europe 
In Europe, major urban regeneration programmes are underway in Elephant and Castle as Elephant Park, and in Stratford, London as The International Quarter London. Lendlease also worked as project manager on a new township at Durrat Al Bahrain on Bahrain Island.

In Europe, Lendlease Project Management & Construction provide project management and construction services for new projects and programmes. In 2015 Lendlease oversaw the restoration of the encaustic tile pavements at The Houses of Parliament.

Lendlease's European Regional Headquarters is in Merchant Square, London.

Major projects and operations

Major construction projects carried out by the company include:

Controversy and incidents
In 2008, the company and a subcontractor abatement firm, the John Galt Corporation, were charged with numerous OSHA safety violations after a fire broke out and killed two firefighters at the Deutsche Bank Building, a Manhattan skyscraper being demolished in the wake of the September 11 attacks. The violations included an employee (Safety Manager) of "Lendlease's Project Management & Construction Business" filling out a safety check list that identified a stand-pipe as being present and functional - when it was actually disconnected in a hard to see spot. The firemen consulted the check list, thought they had a good system and proceeded up into the building to fight the fire.  Only when they reached the dangerous area that was on fire, did they realize the system did not have any water pressure, and they died trying to retreat amid the confusion.  As of June 2011, two out of the three individuals charged in the associated manslaughter and criminally negligent homicide case have been acquitted.

In 2012, Lendlease agreed to pay $56 million in fines and restitution after admitting that the company had routinely over-billed clients and evaded government rules regarding the hiring of women and minority-owned firms. For a ten-year time span ending in 2009, the company along with others devised a scheme to defraud federal, state and local government contracting agencies as well as private clients. The fine is the largest in the city's history.

On 29 October 2012 the long boom of a Lendlease construction crane atop the 1,004 foot high One57 snapped during Hurricane Sandy forcing the evacuation of several buildings in Midtown Manhattan.

In October 2018, Lendlease was announced as a contender for a £330 million contract to renovate Manchester Town Hall. Manchester's Opposition Leader and former MP John Leech uncovered a history of legal, ethical and worker safety controversy surrounding the two shortlisted companies (Laing O'Rourke and Lendlease). He said that "Under absolutely no circumstances" should Lendlease ever be considered for a council contract again until they paid a £3 million Grenfell-style cladding bill in the Green Quarter of Manchester. In January 2019, Lendlease was announced as the winner of the contract. Leech criticised the decision and said it showed a lack of concern for local people.

A 23-year-old worker was killed and two others seriously injured in October 2020 on a Lendlease construction site at Curtin University in Western Australia. This occurred when the roof on the new School of Design and the Built Environment building collapsed.

References

External links
 Lendlease corporate site

 
Financial services companies based in Sydney
Investment companies of Australia
Companies listed on the Australian Securities Exchange
Multinational companies headquartered in Australia
Shopping center management firms
Real estate companies of Australia
Real estate companies established in 1958
Financial services companies established in 1958
1958 establishments in Australia